Ross Haylett-Petty (born 10 January 1994) is a South African-born, Australian rugby union player who currently plays for the Melbourne Rebels in the international Super Rugby competition and Toshiba Brave Lupus in the Japanese Top League.   Domestically he is contracted to the Perth Spirit who compete in the National Rugby Championship. His regular playing position is as a number eight.

Haylett-Petty represented Western Australia at Under-16 and State Schoolboy level and was selected as a member of the Australia under-20 side which competed in the 2014 IRB Junior World Championship in New Zealand.   He scored 1 try in 5 matches to help his country finish 5th in the tournament.

Haylett-Petty currently studies a Master of Commerce at Deakin University.

Super Rugby statistics

References

External links
 

1994 births
Living people
Australian rugby union players
Rugby union number eights
Western Force players
Perth Spirit players
South African emigrants to Australia
Melbourne Rebels players
Toshiba Brave Lupus Tokyo players
Melbourne Rising players
Expatriate rugby union players in Japan
Australian expatriate rugby union players
Rugby union players from Durban